Linda Pritzker (born September 1953) also known by the name Lama Tsomo is an American lama in the Tibetan Buddhist tradition. She is a spiritual teacher, author, philanthropist, and co-founder of the Namchak Foundation and Namchak Retreat Ranch in Missoula, Montana. She is a member of the Pritzker family, known for the Hyatt Hotel fortune.

Early life
Pritzker was born in 1953 in Oberlin, Ohio, the second of three children born to Jewish-American businessman, Robert Pritzker, and Audrey Gilbert. She has two siblings: Jennifer N. Pritzker (b. James, 1950), a retired lieutenant colonel in the U.S. Army and founder of the Pritzker Military Library, and Karen Pritzker (b. 1958).

Her parents divorced in 1979. In 1981, her mother remarried Albert B. Ratner, the co-chairman of Cleveland-based real estate developer Forest City Enterprises. In 1980, her father remarried to Irene Dryburgh with whom he had two children: Matthew Pritzker and Liesel Pritzker Simmons.

Career
After earning a master's degree in Counseling Psychology and working as a psychotherapist for several years, Pritzker began a spiritual path to Tibetan Buddhism.

Pritzker was ordained a lama in February 2005 by Tulku Sangak Rinpoche, a Tibetan meditation master and world holder of the Namchak Lineage, a branch of the Nyingma path of Tibetan Buddhism. She began studying with Rinpoche in 1995 and became fluent in Tibetan. Her journey to Buddhist practices has been documented by ABC News' Dan Harris in his podcast 10% Happier.

She is the author of the Ancient Wisdom for our Times Tibetan Buddhist Practice Series, including Book 1 Why Bother: An Introduction, Book 2 Wisdom and Compassion (Starting with Yourself), and Book 3 Deepening Wisdom, Deepening Connection (to be released on October 11, 2022) She also authored Why is the Dalai Lama Always Smiling? A Westerner's Introduction and Guide to Tibetan Buddhist Practice and The Princess Who Wept Pearls: The Feminine Journey in Fairy Tales and is the co-author of The Lotus & The Rose: A Conversation Between Tibetan Buddhism & Mystical Christianity and a contributor to The Dharma of Dogs: Our Best Friends as Spiritual Teachers edited by Tami Simon. Why is the Dalai Lama Always Smiling? has a foreword written by the Dalai Lama and was a 2016 silver medal winner in the Independent Publisher Book Awards (IPPY Awards).

Today, Lama Tsomo's work revolves around the initiatives of the Namchak Foundation. While the Namchak Retreat Ranch is still under construction, Namchak has several offerings for students looking to begin or strengthen their meditation practice including two online courses, guided meditations, Learning Circles, and several live events per year.

As of July 2018, her net worth was estimated to be $1.77 billion.

Personal life
Pritzker is divorced and has three children: Rachel, Roland, and Rosemary. She lives in Missoula, Montana. She is a Tibetan Buddhist.

Publications
Deepening Wisdom, Deepening Connection (Ancient Wisdom for Our Times Tibetan Buddhist Practice Series)
Wisdom and Compassion (Starting with Yourself) (Ancient Wisdom for Our Times Tibetan Buddhist Practice Series)
Why Bother?: An Introduction (Ancient Wisdom for Our Times Tibetan Buddhist Practice Series)
Why is the Dalai Lama Always Smiling? A Westerner's Introduction and Guide to Tibetan Buddhist Practice
The Lotus & The Rose: A Conversation Between Tibetan Buddhism & Mystical Christianity, co-author with Matthew Fox
The Dharma of Dogs: Our Best Friends as Spiritual Teachers, contributing author, edited by Tami Simon
The Princess Who Wept Pearls: The Feminine Journey in Fairy Tales
"10% Happier with Dan Harris" Podcast, August 2017
"Metta Hour with Sharon Salzberg" Podcast, October 2018
"Buddha at the Gas Pump" Podcast, May 2018
"The Secular Buddhist" Podcast, June 2016
"Synchronicity podcast" May 2016
"Ani Tsering Wangmo: A Life of Merit" in Lion's Roar Newsletter, March 2010.
"Coming Home" in Originally Blessed. Oakland, CA: Creation Spirituality Communities, 2008.
"Dharmasala" in Lion's Roar Newsletter, August 2007.
"Shedra" in Lion's Roar Newsletter, February 2006.

References

American billionaires
American people of Ukrainian-Jewish descent
Female billionaires
Living people
Linda Pritzker
1953 births
Tibetan Buddhists from the United States
Hyatt people
American psychotherapists
Jungian psychologists
People from Oberlin, Ohio
People from Missoula, Montana
Montana Democrats